La Moutade (Auvergnat: La Motada) is a former commune in the Puy-de-Dôme department in Auvergne in central France. On 1 January 2016, it was merged into the new commune of Chambaron-sur-Morge.

See also
Communes of the Puy-de-Dôme department

References

Former communes of Puy-de-Dôme